The Painted Flapper is a 1924 American silent romantic drama film directed by John Gorman and starring James Kirkwood Sr., Pauline Garon, and Crauford Kent.

Cast

Preservation
With no prints of The Painted Flapper located in any film archives, it is a lost film.

References

Bibliography
 Goble, Alan. The Complete Index to Literary Sources in Film. Walter de Gruyter, 1999.

External links

1924 films
1924 romantic drama films
American romantic drama films
Films directed by John Gorman
American silent feature films
American black-and-white films
1920s English-language films
1920s American films
Silent romantic drama films
Silent American drama films